Tina M. Tombs (born April 4, 1962) is a Canadian professional golfer who played on the LPGA Tour. She played under both her maiden name, Tina Tombs, and a married name, Tina Purtzer (1988–92).

Purtzer won once on the LPGA Tour in 1990.

Professional wins

LPGA Tour wins (1)

LPGA Tour playoff record (0–1)

Team appearances
Professional
Handa Cup (representing World team): 2008, 2011

References

External links

Canadian female golfers
Arizona State Sun Devils women's golfers
LPGA Tour golfers
Golfing people from Quebec
Sportspeople from Montreal
1962 births
Living people